Bango may refer to:

Music
 Bango (music), a music style popular at the East African Coast that fuses traditional Portuguese, Arabic influenced taarab music and local coastal bantu languages
 Bongo drum, an Afro-Cuban percussion instrument consisting of a pair of small open bottomed drums
Bango, a musical group best known for their 2006 cover of the song "Tarzan Boy"

People
Margit Bangó (born 1950), Hungarian singer, mother of Marika
Marika Bangó (born 1966), Hungarian singer, daughter of Margit

Other
Bango (cannabis), a type of marijuana
Pangu (pronounced "Bango" in Korean), the creator in Chinese myth
Bango (mascot), the mascot of the National Basketball Association's Milwaukee Bucks
Bango, New South Wales, a locality near Yass, New South Wales
Kecap Bango, a brand of sweet soy sauce